John H. Bates (December 13, 1938 – December 16, 2015) was an American college basketball coach, known for his time at Coppin State University, where he coached the team to a National Association of Intercollegiate Athletics (NAIA) championship and led the program's transition to NCAA Division I status.

Bates was born in Union, South Carolina and attended Allen University. He started his coaching career at the high school level in his home state before ultimately becoming head coach at Maryland Eastern Shore in 1971.  In three seasons with The Hawks, Bates compiled a 73–14 (.830) record. AT UMES, Bates led the school to the 1974 National Invitation Tournament, becoming the first historically black university to gain an berth in this tournament. Following the 1973–74 season, Bates moved to Coppin State, taking star center Joe Pace with him. The duo combined to lead the Eagles to the 1976 NAIA championship. Bates led the Coppin State program for 12 seasons, finishing with a record of 209–121. He is enshrined in the school's athletic hall of fame.

Bates died of an apparent heart attack on December 16, 2015 at 77.

References

External links
 

1938 births
2015 deaths
African-American basketball coaches
Allen University alumni
Basketball coaches from South Carolina
Coppin State Eagles men's basketball coaches
College men's basketball head coaches in the United States
High school basketball coaches in South Carolina
Maryland Eastern Shore Hawks men's basketball coaches
People from Union, South Carolina
20th-century African-American sportspeople
21st-century African-American people